PM was a liberal-leaning daily newspaper published in New York City by Ralph Ingersoll from June 1940 to June 1948 and financed by Chicago millionaire Marshall Field III.

The paper borrowed many elements from weekly news magazines, such as many large photos and at first was bound with staples. In an attempt to be free of pressure from business interests, it did not accept advertising.  These departures from the norms of newspaper publishing created excitement in the industry. Some 11,000 people applied for the 150 jobs available when the publication first hired staff.

Publication history 

The origin of the name is unknown, although Ingersoll recalled that it probably referred to the fact that the paper appeared post meridiem (in the afternoon); The New Yorker reported that the name had been suggested by Lillian Hellman. (There is no historical evidence for the suggestion that the name was an abbreviation of Picture Magazine.)

The first year of the paper was a general success, though it was already in some financial trouble: its circulation of 100,000–200,000 was insufficient. Circulation averaged 165,000, but the paper never managed to sell the 225,000 copies a day it needed to break even. Marshall Field III had become the paper's funder; quite unusually, he was a "silent partner" in this continually money-losing undertaking.

According to a June 21, 1966, memo from Ingersoll:

PM was sold in 1948 and published its final issue on June 22. The next day it was replaced by the New York Star, which folded on January 28, 1949.

Politics

There were accusations that the paper was Communist-dominated, but others have said that the paper frequently opposed the policies of the Communist Party (CP) and engaged into editorial battles with the CP's paper, the Daily Worker.

Staff

Editors

Leo Huberman was labor editor.

Writers

I. F. Stone was the paper's Washington correspondent. He published an award-winning series on European Jewish refugees attempting to run the British blockade to reach Palestine (later collected and published as Underground to Palestine). Staffers included theater critic Louis Kronenberger and film critic Cecelia Ager.  Kenneth G. Crawford wrote for PM from 1939 to 1942.

The sports writers were Tom Meany, Tom O’Reilly and George F. T. Ryall, who covered horse racing. Sophie Smoliar was the New York City reporter working frequently with photographer Arthur Felig ("Weegee") (submitted by her son and a collection of her original articles).  Elizabeth Hawes wrote about fashion, and her sister Charlotte Adams covered food.

Contributors

Theodor Geisel, better known as Dr. Seuss, published more than 400 cartoons on PM's editorial page. Crockett Johnson's comic strip Barnaby debuted in the paper in 1942. Other artists who worked at PM included Ad Reinhardt, one of the founders of Abstract Expressionism, and Joseph Leboit; both contributed margin cartoons and drawings. Noted artist Jack Coggins contributed wartime artwork for at least nine issues between 1940 and 1942.

Coulton Waugh created his short-lived strip, Hank, which began April 30, 1945, in PM. The story of a disabled G.I. returning to civilian life, Hank had a unique look due to Waugh's decorative art style, combined with dialogue lettered in upper and lower case rather than the accepted convention of all uppercase lettering in balloons and captions. Some dialogue was displayed with white lettering reversed into black balloons. Hank sought to raise questions about the reasons for war, and how it might be prevented by the next generation. Waugh discontinued it at the very end of 1945 because of eyestrain. Cartoonist Jack Sparling created the short-lived comic strip Claire Voyant, which ran from 1943 to 1948 in PM, and which was subsequently syndicated by the Chicago Sun-Times. Cartoonist Howard Sparber (né Howard Paul Sparber; 1921–2018) contributed after World War II. 
The Argentine Cartoonist Dante Quinterno publishes: Patoruzú his successful strip in South America.   

Other writers who contributed articles included Erskine Caldwell, Myril Axlerod, McGeorge Bundy, Saul K. Padover, James Wechsler, eventually the paper's editorial writer, Penn Kimball, later a professor at the Columbia University Graduate School of Journalism, Myril Axelrod Bennett, Heywood Hale Broun, James Thurber, Dorothy Parker, Ernest Hemingway, Eugene Lyons, Earl Conrad, Benjamin Stolberg, Louis Adamic, Malcolm Cowley, Tip O'Neill (later Speaker of the House; and Ben Hecht.

Photographers 

Weegee, Margaret Bourke-White, Ray Platnick and Arthur Leipzig were the primary photographers.

 Julius "Skippy" Adelman (born around 1924)
 John Albert (né John Joseph Albert; 1910–1972)
 Bernie Aumuller (né Bernard A. Aumuller; 1920–1971), his father, Bernard George Aumuller (1895–1975) was also a photographer
 Gene Badger
 Margaret Bourke-White (1904–1971)
 Hugh Broderick (né Hugh J. Broderick; 1910–1971)
 William "Bill" Brunk (Los Angeles Examiner)
 John S. DeBiase (1901–1954)
 John Derry
 Stephen Derry
 David Eisendrath, Jr. (né David Benjamin Eisendrath; 1914–1988)
 Morris Engel (1918–2005)
 Alan Fisher
 Morris Gordon (1918–2005)
 Irving Haberman (né Isaac Haberman; 1916–2003)
 Martin Harris (1908–1971)
 Dan Israel
 Charles Fenno Jacobs (1904–1974)
 Dan Keleher, (né Daniel J. Keleher, Jr., 1908–1952)
 Peter Killian
 Arthur Leipzig (né Isidore Leipzig; 1918–2014)
 Helen Levitt (1913–2009)
 Leo Lieb (né Morris Leo Lieb; 1909–2001)
 Ray Platnick (né Raphael Platnick; 1917–1986)
 Weegee, (pseudonym of Arthur (Usher) Fellig (1899–1968)
 Mary "Morrie" Morris (né Mary Louise Morris; 1914–2009), one of the first female AP photographers and pioneer of white umbrellas used give a softer look to flash lighting and portraiture. She, in June 1937, married filmmaker Ralph Steiner. In 1963, she married classical record producer for Mercury, Harold Lawrence (né Harold Levine; 1923–2011), who, at the time, was the General Manager of the London Symphony Orchestra

Contributing photographers 

 Robert Capa (1913–1954)
 Walker Evans (1903–1975)
 Edward Weston (1886–1958)
 Edward Steichen (1879–1973)
 Ralph Steiner (1899–1986)

Sunday magazine section 
Picture News was the Sunday magazine section of PM. 
 Editor: William Thomas McCleery (1912–2000)
 Managing editor: Herbert Yahraes (né Herbert Conrad Yahraes, Jr.; 1906–1985) 
 Associate editors: Lorimer Dexter Heywood (1899–1977), Kenneth Stewart, David Rodman Lindsay (1916–1985), Peggy Wright, Gertrude Stamm
 Staff: Raymond Abrashkin (1911–1960), Skippy Adelman, Holly Beye (née Helen Beye; 1922–2011), W. Russell Bowie, Jr. (1920–2002) (son of Walter Russell Bowie), Mary Morris (maiden; 1914–2009), Charles Norman (1904–1996), Roger Samuel Pippett (1895–1962), Robert Rice (1916–1998), Selma Robinson (maiden; 1899–1977) (mother-in-law of Hymen B. Mintz), Dale Rooks (né Rhine Dale Rooks; 1917–1954) (photographer), Lillian E. Ross (née Lillian Rosovsky; 1918–2017)
 Art director: H. Russell Countryman

See also
 The Day Book

Bibliography
 Jason E. Hill: Artist as Reporter. Weegee, Ad Reinhardt, and the PM News Picture. University of California Press, Oakland 2018. 
 Paul Milkman: PM. A New Deal in Journalism 1940–1948. Rutgers University Press, New Brunswick 1997.

References

External links 
 Fulton History newspaper archive for PM
 Morris Engel Archive
 Old Magazine Articles
 Kansas State University
 Dr. Seuss Went to War

Defunct newspapers published in New York City
Newspapers established in 1940
Publications disestablished in 1948
Socialist newspapers
Daily newspapers published in New York City
1940 establishments in New York City
1948 disestablishments in New York (state)